Bittersweet Symphony is the seventh album by Jade Valerie formerly of the band Sweetbox, and the second under her new stage name, Jade Valerie. It was released March 5, 2008 by Universal (Japan).

The album contained many ballad influences, and only two tracks contained famous classical pieces. The album also saw a departure from the widely varied sounds Jade has become known for, this time opting for many of the tracks to showcase a typical pop, dance, or ballad sound. It also, for the first time, featured a mainly piano-oriented track, as well as a guest writer for track, "We Can Run".

Track listing
All songs written by "Jade Valerie" Villalon and Robert "Geo" Rosan, except "We Can Run", co-written by Shoko Hase. Sample credits are in parenthesis below.

 "Unbreakable" (based on Moonlight Sonata by Beethoven)
 "Like a Bird"
 "Out in the Sea" (samples "The Flower Duet" by Lakmé)
 "Razorman"
 "Living by Numbers"
 "The Last"
 "We Can Run"
 "Stuck with You"
 "Lucky Lady"
 "Piece of Love"
 "Always Mine"
 "Undone"
 "No, You Don't"
 "Empty Pages"

Singles
 Unbreakable

Chart positions
 Oricon International Charts - #13
 Oricon Charts - #59

References

External links
 Jade Valerie Official Site
 Jade Valerie Official Myspace

Jade Valerie albums
2008 albums